Stanisław Józef Bronisław Kasznica (July 25, 1908 – May 12, 1948) was the last commander of the National Armed Forces (NSZ), an anti-communist, and anti-Nazi paramilitary organization, which was part of the Polish resistance movement in World War II and in the period following it.

He was born in Lwów, and his father, Stanisław Wincenty Antoni Kasznica, was rector and professor of the Poznań University in Greater Poland. During World War II he initially fought in the Polish Army, joining the National Armed Forces resistance group after the defeat of Polish military. After the war he did not cease the fight for Poland's freedom and fought with the NSZ against the Soviet-installed communist regime.

He was arrested by the Polish communist secret police, the Urząd Bezpieczeństwa, in February 1947, tortured and condemned to death by a communist Polish court. He was executed on May 12, 1948 in the Warsaw Mokotów Prison. His symbolic grave is located at Warsaw Powązki Cemetery.

Kasznica used numerous nom de guerres, including Stanisław Wąsacz, Wąsowski, Przepona, Służa, Maszkowski, and Borowski.

Honours and awards
Silver Cross of Virtuti Militari
Grand Cross of the Order of Polonia Restituta (posthumously, 2009)
Cross of Valour
Cross of the National Armed Deed (posthumously, 1993)
Silver Cross of the National Deed Armed with Swords (1944)

References 

1908 births
1948 deaths
Military personnel from Lviv
People from the Kingdom of Galicia and Lodomeria
National Party (Poland) politicians
Camp of Great Poland politicians
Polish Army officers
National Armed Forces members
Cursed soldiers
Recipients of the Silver Cross of the Virtuti Militari
Grand Crosses of the Order of Polonia Restituta
Recipients of the Cross of Valour (Poland)
People executed by the Polish People's Republic
Executed military personnel
Executed Polish people
Burials at Powązki Cemetery
Politicians from Lviv